Boyka may refer to:

 Mia Boyka (born 1997), Russian singer
 Boyka: Undisputed, 2017 film